The Flin Flon Museum is a former Canadian National Railway station, opened in 1936. It was located in downtown Flin Flon, Manitoba, and moved to its current location in 1983 to serve as the community museum.

History

The station was located at milepost 87.5, the end of the rail line from The Pas to Flin Flon, along the CNR Flin Flon subdivision. The town also has a grain elevator at the station.

The storey-and-a-half structure is an example of a 2nd Class Canadian National Railway Station, which were built in communities of a notable size. “With its paired tall sash windows, broad cross-gabled hipped roof with deep bellcast eaves supported by decorative brackets, and ornamental half-timbering in the gable front over the office, the station is a fine surviving representative of the type.” It has been designated as Municipal Heritage Site (Number 383), preserved under authority of the provincial Heritage Resources Act, since May 14, 2014 . 

The station is a long rectangle "covered by a low-pitched hipped shingled roof, with a gable-roofed crossing wing terminating at the front in a shallow bay with windows on three sides". There is a short rectangular wing to the rear, with the former passenger area to the right and the former baggage and freight handling area to the left of this area. The Canadian Register of Historic Places notes the following features and ornamentation at the station: "the light-painted stucco cladding,  the organization of the fenestration: large window openings containing paired tall sash windows divided horizontally into three: a square pane at the top with a larger oblong pane in the middle and small sliding ventilating panes at the bottom, the main passenger doorway at centre right, with freight doors to the left, the contrasting-coloured ornamental half, timbering in the gable front, the deep eaves, supported by large, decorative wooden brackets".

References

Railway stations in Manitoba
Municipal Heritage Sites in Manitoba